American Mind can refer to:

 The American Mind, a publication by the Claremont Institute
 The Closing of the American Mind, 1987 book by Allan Bloom
 The Coddling of the American Mind, 2018 book by Greg Lukianoff and Jonathan Haidt
 The Occupation of the American Mind, 2016 documentary film
 Scientific American Mind, a former American popular science magazine
 Runyan v. State, an 1877 Indiana court case that argued that a "distinct American Mind" is against the duty to retreat